Steven Andrew Tananbaum (born 1964 or 1965) is an American hedge fund manager, the founding partner and chief investment officer of GoldenTree Asset Management, which he founded in 2000. In 2018, Bloomberg referred to Tananbaum as "one of Wall Street’s biggest investors in distressed debt."

Early life
Tananbaum earned a bachelor's degree in Economics from Vassar College.

Career
He worked for Kidder, Peabody & Co., before joining MacKay Shields, where he led the firm's high yield group, but left to start his own company.

Tananbaum founded GoldenTree Asset Management in 2000.

In 2007, the Financial Times included Tananbaum in their list of "The 20 rising hedge fund stars".

As of March 2019, GoldenTree has about $28 billion in assets under management (AUM).

Personal life
In 1992, Tananbaum married Lisa A. Munster. She graduated from Northwestern University in 1986, majoring in political science. They live in Palm Beach, Florida and Westchester County, New York, and are both art collectors.

Art collecting

Collection
Their collection includes works by Damien Hirst, Brice Marden, Ellsworth Kelly, Frank Stella, Willem de Kooning, Gerhard Richter, Jenny Saville, Takashi Murakami, Andreas Gursky, and Tom Sachs.

Legal proceedings
Tananbaum v. Gagosian Gallery, 651889/2018 - In 2018 Tananbaum sued the Gagosian Gallery, a New York gallery claiming that the gallery and the artist Jeff Koons "over the non-delivery of three Koons sculptures" specifically claiming that deposits were accepted and the delivery of the works delayed.

Philanthropy
In 2017, they gave $1 million to the Block Museum of Art at Northwestern University to endow the position of the Steven and Lisa Munster Tananbaum Curator of Modern and Contemporary Art.

References

Living people
1960s births
American hedge fund managers
American company founders
Vassar College alumni
People from Palm Beach, Florida
People from Westchester County, New York
Chief investment officers